Yumbe Hospital, is a hospital in the West Nile sub-region of the Northern Region of Uganda.

Location
The geographical coordinates of Yumbe General Hospital are: 03°27'56.0"N, 31°14'35.0"E (Latitude:3.465556; Longitude:31.243056).

Overview
Yumbe Hospital is a 100-bed public hospital. It serves Yumbe District and parts of the neighboring districts of Moyo, Koboko,  Maracha, and Arua. The hospital was constructed in the 1960s and did not get a face lift or renovation for the next 50 years.

Beginning in January 2018, the government of Uganda, using funds borrowed from the (a) Saudi Fund for Development, (b) Arab Bank for Economic Development in Africa (BADEA) and (c) OPEC Fund for International Development (OFID), contracted Sadeem Al-Kuwait General Trading & Contracting Company, to renovate, rehabilitate and expand the hospital. The renovations, expected to cost approximately US$18,500,000 (approx. USh69 billion), are expected to last 24 months.

The upgrade includes the expansion of the Emergency Room, Outpatient Department, Maternity Unit and Postnatal Ward. The work includes physical infrastructure, equipment and furniture. As part of the renovation, an ambulance, a double-cabin pick-up truck and a mini-bus will be procured, to facilitate patient transfer and improve general hospital management and hospital outreach.

The contract also calls for the rehabilitation of old staff quarters and the construction of new staff houses.

See also
List of hospitals in Uganda

References

External links
 Website of Uganda Ministry of Health
 'Expect standard work at Yumbe hospital construction' - Aita As of 26 July 2018. 

Hospitals in Uganda
Yumbe District
West Nile sub-region
Northern Region, Uganda
1960s establishments in Uganda
Hospital buildings completed in 1968